The Forest of Atholl (also known as Atholl Forest) is a deer forest near the Scottish village of Blair Atholl, Perth and Kinross, first recorded in the 12th century.  in size, most of it is within the Cairngorms National Park.

References

Protected areas of Perth and Kinross
12th-century establishments in Scotland